Portrait of Matilde Juva Branca is an 1851 oil on canvas painting by Francesco Hayez, now in the Galleria d'Arte Moderna in Milan, to which it was given in 1893 by Carlo Weber.

Born Matilde Branca into a family of musicians, she became a singer, taking the name Matilde Juva Branca after marriage.

References

Branca
1851 paintings
Paintings in the Galleria d'Arte Moderna, Milan
Branca